Teepe Glacier is below the northeast face of Teepe Pillar in Grand Teton National Park, Wyoming, United States. The glacier is immediately southeast of Grand Teton in the heart of the Cathedral Group collection of high peaks in the Teton Range.

See also
 List of glaciers in the United States

References

Glaciers of Grand Teton National Park